Celebrity Big Brother 14 was the fourteenth series of the British reality television series Celebrity Big Brother. The series launched on 18 August 2014 on Channel 5 and ended after 26 days on 12 September. It was the seventh celebrity series and the eleventh series of Big Brother overall to air on the channel. Emma Willis hosted the series, whilst Rylan Clark presented the spin-off show Celebrity Big Brother's Bit on the Side along with Iain Lee, Willis and regular panelist Luisa Zissman.

The series was won by actor Gary Busey. With an average of 2.1 million, this series was the lowest watched series on Channel 4 or Channel 5 until Celebrity Big Brother 16 the following year. It was down 1 million on the previous January series. On finale night, it was revealed that the series would return in January 2015.

James Jordan returned to the house for Celebrity Big Brother 19 as an All-Star, representing this series. He was the fourth housemate to be evicted.

Pre-series

Logo
The official eye logo was released on 6 August 2014 and features a similar design to Big Brother 15 but with the iconic star in the centre of the eye.

Live feed
Despite fifteenth series of Big Brother having only an hour and a half live feed for the entire series run, it was officially announced on 6 August 2014 that there would be an hour of live feed available almost nightly on Channel 5 due to the ratings success of the previous editions of the show and mass viewer request.

Teasers
On 11 August 2014, the first 30-second teaser was released which features footage from past series of Celebrity Big Brother on Channel 5. However, the tenth series or eleventh series are not included.

Sponsorship
SuperCasino continued its sponsorship for this series, after previously sponsoring the fourteenth and fifteenth series of the civilian series, and the twelfth and thirteenth series of the celebrity series.

House
The house was completely revamped ahead of the series and was given a "glamorous VIP makeover". Official house pictures were released on 18 August 2014, the same day as launch day. The diary room was coated in a gold sparkle style with gold screens either side of the chair. The control room below the diary room was removed as the 'Power Trip' theme from Big Brother 15 was dis-continued. Detailed parts of the Celebrity Big Brother eye were placed all around the main parts of the house including the kitchen, living area, dining area and bathroom. the living area now had more comfortable seating unlike the black and green sofas for the civilians. In the bathroom the colour scheme had been changed to gold with the shower surrounded by a golden cover for the celebrities. In the garden the previous sunbed area had been moved over and was replaced by a seating area next to the pool. Coloured lines were also spaced throughout the garden making it look less bland than what it did look like in the last series. The bedroom wallpaper was changed to an orange city skyline with a new fluffy carpet and one extra bed for Gary Busey.

Housemates

Audley Harrison
Audley Harrison is a British professional boxer from Harlesden, London, who currently fights in the heavyweight division. At the 2000 Sydney Olympics, he became the first British fighter to win an Olympic gold medal in the superheavyweight division, and had also won gold at the 1998 Commonwealth Games. He stands at 6 ft, 5 1⁄2 in (1.97 m) and usually weighs around 255 lb (116 kg). He was the runner-up of this series.

Claire King
Claire King is an English actress, most notable for her role as Kim Tate on the ITV soap opera Emmerdale from 1989 to 1999, 2018–. Her other television credits include playing Karen Betts in Bad Girls, from 2000 to 2004. Her classic soap character in Emmerdale became popular on most television magazines, and gained her numerous awards including "Best Bitch" and "Best Exit". She was also one of the highest paid soap actresses on ITV. On Day 14, she left the house to receive medical attention, and on Day 16, it was announced that she would not be returning.

David McIntosh
David McIntosh is a British television personality, model, fitness expert, former soldier and security guard, in which he has more recently claimed to fame for being the current fiancé of Kelly Brook. He participated in the Sky 1 revival television series Gladiators, where he played under the alias name "Tornado". Since his career started, he appeared in the fitness magazine Muscle & Fitness, and in Jennifer Hudson's music video for her single, "Walk It Out". On Day 10, he became the first housemate to be evicted.

Dee Kelly
Deirdre "Dee" Kelly, better known as White Dee, is a British reality television personality from Birmingham, who is known for appearing on the Channel 4 reality documentary series Benefits Street. The show documented the lives of James Turner Street residents (including Dee herself), where 90% of the street claim the use of welfare payments. She became the first housemate to enter the house on Day 1 and was set a secret mission by "Big Brother", in which she had to disguise and pretend to be a royal family member called "The Duchess of Solihull", who was the 21st person in line to the British throne. In addition to this, she had to convince the final three housemates, Frenchy, Leslie, and Gary (all of whom live in the US), that she was royalty. She passed the task on Day 2. On Day 26, she finished fifth.

Edele Lynch
Edele Lynch is an Irish singer-songwriter, musician, dancer, and actress, who is best known as the lead singer of pop girl group B*Witched. Her twin sister, Keavy Lynch is also a member whilst her brother Shane is known as a member of boy band Boyzone. The girl group's first four singles, "C'est la Vie", "Rollercoaster", "To You I Belong", and "Blame It on the Weatherman", all reached number one in the UK Singles Chart. In 2012, the band reunited for an ITV2 documentary and tour, The Big Reunion. On Day 26, she left in sixth place.

Frenchy
Angelique "Frenchy" Morgan is a French television personality, actress, dancer, and model, best known for her appearances in VH1's reality shows such as Rock of Love 2, Rock of Love: Charm School, and the second season of I Love Money. She is currently working as a host on a television channel, and a radio blog. On Day 5, She was sent to "The Celebrity Scrapheap" as one of the least entertaining housemates along with Gary, and therefore faced the first eviction. She was saved on Day 7, and chose James to replace her. On Day 14, she was nominated. On Day 17 she became the third housemate to be evicted.

Gary Busey
Gary Busey is an American actor, who is best known for his appearances in films such as Big Wednesday, Lethal Weapon, Point Break, and The Buddy Holly Story, for which he was nominated for an Academy Award as the main title role. He has also made a career in television by guest starring in popular shows like Entourage, Walker, Texas Ranger and Gunsmoke. On Day 5, He was sent to "The Celebrity Scrapheap" as the most boring housemate, meaning he automatically faced the first eviction. With 24 total nominations, Gary is currently the celebrity housemate with the highest number of nominations in CBB history, beating Jim Davidson's 22 nominations. On Day 26, he was announced winner of the series.

George Gilbey
George Gilbey is a British television personality, known for starring in the BAFTA Award-winning observational documentary series, Gogglebox on Channel 4. Gilbey appeared in the show since 2013, alongside his mother Linda and step-father Pete, as they give opinions of the country's biggest television shows airing. He left the house on Day 26 finishing in fourth place.

James Jordan
James Jordan is an English ballroom dancer and choreographer, who had competed as one of the male professional partners on Strictly Come Dancing, from 2006 to 2013. His dance partner and wife, Aleksandra "Ola" Jordan, was until 2015  one of the female professionals on the show. The couple became the first married duo to compete against each other, since his and Ola's debut on fourth series of the show. He started his dance training at the age of 13, turning professional in 2000. On Day 26, he left the house in third place. He later returned to compete in Celebrity Big Brother 19 as an "All star" housemate.

Kellie Maloney
Kellie Maloney is a retired British boxing manager, promoter, and UKIP politician, who is most notable for being the manager of heavyweight boxer Lennox Lewis. During her time in politics, priorities included combating crime and reducing immigration however, she did create controversy over allegations of homophobia and racism. Maloney announced publicly that she was undergoing a sex change and would be known as "Kellie". On Day 5, she was sent to "The Celebrity Scrapheap", and automatically faced the first eviction. On Day 19, Kellie became the fifth evictee, leaving in a double eviction with Stephanie. Maloney received the second fewest votes to save.

Lauren Goodger
Lauren Goodger is an English television personality, beautician, model, and singer, who previously starred in the ITV2 semi-reality programme The Only Way is Essex, from debuting in the first series to her departure in sixth series. She dated fellow cast member Mark Wright from 2001 to 2012, dumping him in the second series finale of the show. On Day 24, she became the seventh housemate to be evicted, in a double eviction alongside Ricci.

Leslie Jordan
Leslie Jordan was an American actor and playwright, best known for his recurring role as Beverley Leslie on the hit U.S. television sitcom Will & Grace. He received an Emmy Award for Outstanding Guest Actor for his portrayal of the character on the show. Since then, he has managed to become an accomplished stage performer, and has acted in Broadway theater plays such as Sordid Lives, Found a Peanut, and Lucky Guy. He also had a one-man show and continued to have guest appearances on various American TV shows. On Day 12, Leslie became the second housemate to be evicted.

Ricci Guarnaccio
Ricci Guarnaccio is an English reality television personality, who is known for being as a cast member on the MTV reality series Geordie Shore, from series 2 to series 5. He is the former fiancé of fellow cast member Vicky Pattison. More recently, Ricci had taken part in the first series of Ex on the Beach, where he was face-to-face with Vicky once more. On Day 24, he became the sixth housemate to be evicted.

Stephanie Pratt
Stephanie Pratt is an American reality television star.  She rose to prominence after being cast as a supporting cast member on the MTV reality series The Hills, and later being promoted to a main member of the cast. She is the younger sister of Spencer Pratt and the sister-in-law of Heidi Montag, who competed as a couple on Celebrity Big Brother 11 in 2013. She has made several reality appearances on British television, including a starring role on Made in Chelsea. On Day 19, she became the fourth person to be evicted from the house.

Summary

Nominations table

Notes

Ratings
Official ratings are taken from BARB and include Channel 5 +1.

References

External links

2014 in British television
2014 British television seasons
14
Channel 5 (British TV channel) reality television shows